Harrisburg International Airport  is a public airport in Middletown, Pennsylvania, nine miles (15 km) southeast of Harrisburg. It is owned by the Susquehanna Area Regional Airport Authority.

The airport code MDT refers to Middletown, the town in which the airport is located. Planes landing at MDT from the south are often routed near Three Mile Island Nuclear Generating Station a few miles from the airport. The airport, frequently referred to as HIA, is the primary commercial airport in South Central Pennsylvania and is the third-busiest airport in Pennsylvania for passenger enplanements and cargo shipments behind Philadelphia International Airport and Pittsburgh International Airport.

History
Harrisburg International Airport has been serving south-central Pennsylvania for over 100 years. Beginning in 1898, the Signal Corps of the U.S. Army was stationed here. This was followed by the first military airplanes landing in 1918 at what had become Olmsted Field of the fledgling U.S. Army Air Service.

The Middletown Air Depot (later Middletown Air Materiel Area) at Olmsted provided logistical and maintenance support of military aircraft until it closed in 1969. In 1968, airline flights moved from Capital City Airport to the former Air Force base, renamed as Olmstead State Airport. The airport was renamed Harrisburg International Airport in 1973. Architect William Pereira designed the new terminals, completed in 1973.

In 1998, the Commonwealth transferred ownership to the Susquehanna Area Regional Airport Authority (SARAA). The Authority board consists of community volunteers appointed to staggered, five-year terms by the elected officials from Cumberland, Dauphin, and York counties, the cities of Harrisburg and York, and Fairview and Lower Swatara townships.

About 1,400 people work in the system of Harrisburg International Airport.

A new 360,000 square-foot terminal was completed in 2004. It cost $120 million and was designed by the Sheward Partnership.

Facilities and aircraft

It has one asphalt runway, 13/31, .

Runway 13 has a CAT III approach allowing operations down to  RVR (Runway Visual Range). The airport has a Surface Movement Guidance Control System (SMGCS) that allows aircraft and vehicle ground movements during reduced visibility (below  RVR down to  RVR).

The airfield also boasts a 140-foot control tower and associated approach control staffed and operated by FAA air traffic controllers.

In the year ending December 31, 2021, the airport had 48,788 aircraft operations, an average of 134 per day: 26% air taxi, 29% general aviation, 27% scheduled commercial and 18% military. 29 aircraft were then based at this airport: 6 single-engine, 4 multi-engine, 11 jet, and 8 military.

The terminal has 12 gates and is a pier finger lay out near the middle of the airfield, almost parallel to the runway. Delta Air Lines uses A1 and A3. United Airlines uses B1 and B3. Frontier Airlines uses B5. Allegiant Air uses B6. American Airlines uses B2, and C1–C3. Gate A2 and B4 are currently unused.

Ground transportation
Built in 2004, and attached to the new terminal building via a climate-controlled sky bridge, the Multi-Modal Transportation Facility (MMTF) is a four-story facility that handles all ground transportation. The top three levels have 2,504 parking places for Short-Term Hourly, Daily, and Long-Term public parking. The first level accommodates all limos, taxis, hotel shuttles, public and charter buses, plus the rental car ready/return lot.

In the first floor lobby area are six rental car counters, restrooms, flight and bus information displays, and a seating area. On the second floor of the lobby area, climate-controlled moving sidewalks connect to the aerial walkway to the terminal.

Route 7 of the Capital Area Transit System runs to downtown Harrisburg and surrounding communities.

Airlines and destinations

Passenger

Cargo
Harrisburg International Airport has freight-forwarding capability. The airport is next to I-76 (Pennsylvania Turnpike), I-83, and I-81, allowing fast transfer of goods. Three major air cargo shippers maintain air service at the east end of the airport in an apron area next to the runway:

Statistics

Top destinations

Annual traffic

Pennsylvania Air National Guard use
  
Despite the closure of Olmsted AFB in 1969, the US Air Force continues an Air National Guard presence at Harrisburg in the form of Harrisburg Air National Guard Station and the Pennsylvania Air National Guard's 193rd Special Operations Wing (193 SOW), an Air Force Special Operations Command (AFSOC)-gained unit flying the EC-130J Commando Solo aircraft.  The 193 SOW is the sole operator of this critical aircraft asset for the entire US Air Force and in 2001 transitioned from the EC-130E to the new EC-130J variant.  The wing has seen extensive federal service in recent years in support of Operations Just Cause, Desert Storm, Enduring Freedom and Iraqi Freedom.

The Air Force Presidential Airlift Squadron uses MDT as a practice airport for a number of reasons: its runway is long enough for a loaded 747, relatively low traffic, close proximity to Andrews Air Force Base, and the presence of the Air National Guard at MDT.

See also
 List of airports in Pennsylvania

References

External links

 Harrisburg International Airport (official site)
 Harrisburg International Airport at Pennsylvania Bureau of Aviation
 
 

Airports in Pennsylvania
Transportation in Harrisburg, Pennsylvania
Transportation buildings and structures in Dauphin County, Pennsylvania
William Pereira buildings